Haimanti Rakshit Das (born 18 June) better known as Haimanti is a Bangladeshi playback singer. She mostly sings for films and TV series.

She rose to fame after winning reality television competition series Notun Kuri in 1993. Her discography includes, Dakpion, Mone Pore Tomake, Premer Choya, and Smritir Canvas. She also attended an academy for children's welfare Jatiyo Shishu Purushkar.

Early life and personal life 
Haimanti was born on 18 June in Chittagong, Bangladesh. She comes from a musical family. She completed her Graduation in economics from University in Bangladesh. Her father is an engineer named Manash Rakshit and her mother is a housewife named Sharmistha Rakshit  Haimanti is married to Ashim Das.

Career
When she was studying in class five her first album Dakpion (1994) was released and then Mone Pore Tomake (1997) and Premer Choya (2000).
One of her albums is a duet with singer Asif Akbar. She did playback over 20 films She started first movie music song the name of movie Moner Sathe Juddho, Shotru Shotru Khela, Amon Sudhu Tumar Ei, Pita Matar Amanot and Koti Takar Fokir. Hamanti is singing a movie name Phagun Haway on language movement. She is basically popular for a stage singer. She recently sang a song in a Matal movie called Thako Tumi Pinjare, whose music director Ahmed Imtiaz Bulbul.

Discography

Albums

Tracks

Awards and nominations

References

External links
 
 Haimanti Rakshit on Spotify
Haimanti Rakshit on Itunes

Bangladeshi playback singers
20th-century Bangladeshi women singers
20th-century Bangladeshi singers
People from Chittagong District
Living people
21st-century Bangladeshi women singers
21st-century Bangladeshi singers
Rabindra Sangeet exponents
1982 births
20th-century women composers
Bangladeshi Hindus
Bengali Hindus